The 1991 Fernleaf Butter Classic was a women's tennis tournament played on outdoor hard courts at the Wellington Renouf Tennis Centre in Wellington, New Zealand and was part of the Tier V category of the 1991 WTA Tour. It was the fourth edition of the tournament and was held from 4 February until 10 February 1991. First-seeded Leila Meskhi won the singles title and earned $18,000 first-prize money.

Finals

Singles
 Leila Meskhi defeated  Andrea Strnadová 3–6, 7–6(7–3), 6–2
 It was Meskhi's 1st singles title of the year and the 4th of her career.

Doubles
 Jo-Anne Faull /  Julie Richardson defeated  Belinda Borneo /  Clare Wood 2–6, 7–5, 7–6(7–4)

See also
 1991 BP National Championships – men's tournament

References

External links
 ITF tournament edition details
 Tournament draws

Fernleaf Classic
Wellington Classic
Fern
February 1991 sports events in New Zealand